Lewis McLear (born 26 May 1996) is a Scottish professional footballer who plays as a midfielder for Caledonian Braves. 

He has previously played for St Mirren, Elgin City, Edinburgh City, Albion Rovers, Stirling Albion, and Annan Athletic.

Career
McLear made his senior debut on 20 December 2014 in the Scottish Premiership.

On 31 March 2015, McLear signed a three-year contract extension with St Mirren. The deal means that he will be contracted to the club until the summer of 2018.

In January 2016, McLear joined Scottish League Two side Stirling Albion on loan until the end of the season.

McLear left St Mirren in June 2017, after failing to break into the first team. After a trial spell with Elgin City, McLear signed for Edinburgh City in March 2018. He left the club at the end of the 2017–18 season.

On 2 June 2018, McLear signed for Albion Rovers. He then signed for Stirling Albion in January 2019.

On 13 June 2019, McLear signed for Annan Athletic.

McLear joined Caledonian Braves in 2021 after leaving Annan.

Career statistics

References

1996 births
Living people
Footballers from Bellshill
Scottish footballers
St Mirren F.C. players
Stirling Albion F.C. players
Elgin City F.C. players
F.C. Edinburgh players
Scottish Professional Football League players
Association football midfielders
Albion Rovers F.C. players
Annan Athletic F.C. players